Platinum–iridium alloys are alloys of the platinum group precious metals platinum and iridium.

Typical alloy proportions are 90:10 or 70:30 (Pt:Ir). These have the chemical stability of platinum, but increased hardness. The Vickers hardness of pure platinum is 56 HV while platinum with 50% of iridium can reach over 500 HV. This improved hardness has also been considered as beneficial for use in platinum jewellery, particularly watch cases.

Owing to their high cost, these alloys are rarely used. They have been used for spinnerets in the manufacture of synthetic fibres.

Their well-known use is in metrology, where they are used to make the international prototypes used by international standards bodies for mass standards such as the international prototype of the kilogram and the international prototype of the metre, although both have been superseded during the 2019 redefinition of the SI base units.

The other extremely widespread use for Pt/Ir alloy is fabrication of metal microelectrodes for electrical stimulation of nervous tissue and electrophysiological recordings. Pt/Ir alloy has an optimal combination of mechanical and electrochemical properties for this application. Pure iridium is very difficult to pull into small diameter wires; at the same time, platinum has a low Young's modulus which makes pure platinum wires bend too easily during insertion into nervous tissue. Additionally, platinum–iridium alloys containing oxides of both metals can be electro-deposited onto the surface of microelectrodes.

References 

Iridium, Platinum alloys
Iridium
Precious metal alloys